Afro-Jaws is an album by saxophonist Eddie "Lockjaw" Davis recorded in 1960 and released on the Riverside label.

Reception

The Allmusic site awarded the album four stars with the review by Scott Yanow stating, "The Afro-Cuban setting is perfect for the tough-toned tenor, who romps through the infectious tunes".

Track listing 
All compositions by Gil Lopez except as indicated
 "Wild Rice" - 4:53   
 "Guanco Lament"  - 5:18   
 "Tin Tin Deo"  (Gil Fuller, Chano Pozo) - 5:10   
 "Jazz-A-Samba" - 4:14   
 "Alma Alegre" - 5:24   
 "Star Eyes" (Gene de Paul, Don Raye) - 6:20   
 "Afro-Jaws" (Eddie "Lockjaw" Davis) - 7:36

Personnel 
Eddie "Lockjaw" Davis - tenor saxophone
Clark Terry - flugelhorn, trumpet
John Ballo (tracks 3 & 4), Ernie Royal, Phil Sunkel - trumpet
Lloyd Mayers - piano
Larry Gales - bass
Ben Riley - drums
Ray Barretto - congas, bongos
Gil Lopez - arranger

References 

Eddie "Lockjaw" Davis albums
1961 albums
Albums produced by Orrin Keepnews
Riverside Records albums